Albert Flamm (1823–1906) was a German landscape painter.

Biography

Albert Flamm was born at Cologne.  He was a pupil of Andreas Achenbach at the Kunstakademie Düsseldorf, where he settled after traveling in Italy. He is associated with the Düsseldorf school of painting. His pictures, the subjects of which were chosen almost exclusively from Italian scenery, command attention by their truthfulness to nature, careful execution, and bright and varied effects of color.

One of his best productions is the "Approaching Storm in the Campagna" (1862).  Among others may be mentioned "Via Appia", in the Kunsthalle at Hamburg, a fine "Italian Landscape" (1856), in the Ravené Gallery, Berlin, and "View of Cumæ" (1881), in the National Gallery in Berlin.  In 1900 the title of professor was conferred upon him.

See also
 List of German painters

References

External links

19th-century German painters
German male painters
20th-century German painters
20th-century German male artists
1823 births
1906 deaths
19th-century German male artists
Düsseldorf school of painting